Anthony Suji (born Otieno Suji Ondik; 5 February 1976) is a former Kenyan cricketer. He is a right-handed batsman and a right-arm medium-fast pace bowler. He is the brother of player Martin Suji. He also played for The Western Chiefs.

Suji scored a first-class century against Bermuda in 2005. He was a member of the 1999, 2003 and 2007 Cricket World Cup squads. He did not play any cricket since 2010.

External links
 

1976 births
Living people
Cricketers from Nairobi
Kenyan cricketers
Kenya One Day International cricketers
Kenya Twenty20 International cricketers
Cricketers at the 1998 Commonwealth Games
Cricketers at the 1999 Cricket World Cup
Cricketers at the 2003 Cricket World Cup
Western Chiefs cricketers
Commonwealth Games competitors for Kenya